Delta Beta Tau, is an American co-ed Buddhist college fraternity founded at San Diego State University (SDSU). The fraternity was founded on September 9, 2015 by ten SDSU students as the first Buddhist college fraternity in the United States. Although the fraternity was founded on Buddhist principles, the fraternity accepts people of any religious background and also accepts members who are already members of other college fraternities. The fraternity is run almost entirely on voluntary donations and has a membership due for pledges of just one dollar per semester.

As of August 20, 2019 the fraternity has initiated 223 active members at its founding chapter at SDSU.

History 
The fraternity was founded and organized by Dharma Bum Temple, an American Buddhist temple near SDSU for which the fraternity based the letters of its name off of. The co-founder of the temple, Jeffrey Zlotnik, was in Beta Theta Pi in college and suggested creating a Buddhist fraternity as a way to find a way to instill college students with Buddhist principles that would follow them throughout college and for the rest of their lives. Dharma Bum Temple chose SDSU to build the first chapter of the fraternity because it already had a strong presence on the campus from running an SDSU meditation club called "The Aztec Dharma Bums".

There was originally plans to create one Buddhist fraternity and one Buddhist sorority, but it was eventually decided to create one co-ed fraternity.

In 2017, the fraternity announced plans to start another chapter at University of California, San Diego (UCSD) as well.

Principles 

The co-ed fraternity takes the Six Paramitas of Mahayana Buddhism as the founding principles of the fraternity. The rules for the fraternity are based on Buddhist principles and to join pledges do community service and attend meditation retreats. Activities the fraternity offers include meditation retreats, guest speakers and community service events, with social gatherings incorporating mindfulness into them.

As of January 2018, there are no official Greek houses for Delta Beta Tau members to live together in, instead meetings are held at locations near the campuses until Greek housing for the fraternity can be established. Once Greek housing is set up, the fraternity plans on having house rules based on Buddhist principles and for the fraternity to hold normal Greek events such as formals and dating dashes, but with Buddhist values and mindfulness elements incorporated.

Service 
Delta Beta Tau's service programs are largely entwined with the outreach programs of Dharma Bum Temple, the temple that helped organize the founding of the fraternity. The fraternity focuses on community service, taking the principles of Buddhism as the basis for its values. Fraternity members are trained in guiding meditation so they can teach meditation to the community as a form of community service. Other outreach programs the fraternity hosts include volunteer work at local animal shelters, as well as participating in the existing prison outreach and homeless feeding programs that are hosted by Dharma Bum Temple.

Gallery

See also 
 Buddhism in the United States
 Dharma Bum Temple

References

External links 
 Delta Beta Tau (Official Website)

Student societies in the United States
Fraternities and sororities in the United States
 
Buddhism in California
Student organizations established in 2015
2015 establishments in California